Novosayranovo (Yañı Sayran) is a rural locality (a village) in Novotroitsky Selsoviet, Chishminsky District, Bashkortostan, Russia. The population was 24 as of 2010. There is 1 street.

Geography 
Novosayranovo is located 25 km southeast of Chishmy (the district's administrative centre) by road. Barsunbashevo is the nearest rural locality.

References 

Rural localities in Chishminsky District